Feuerstein (German: lit., "firestone", flint) may refer to:

 Aaron Feuerstein (1925–2021), third-generation owner and CEO of Malden Mills in Lawrence, Massachusetts
 Adam Feuerstein (fl. 1990s–2020s), American columnist and journalist in the biotechnology sector
 Arthur Feuerstein (born 1935), American chess player
 Bedřich Feuerstein (1892–1936), Czech architect, painter, and essayist
 Claire Feuerstein (born 1986), French tennis player
 Georg Feuerstein (1947–2012), German-American Indologist and leading authority on Yoga in the West
 Herbert Feuerstein (1937–2020), German comedian and entertainer
 Joshua Feuerstein (born 1981), American Internet personality and evangelist 
 Mark Feuerstein (born 1971), American actor
 Familie Feuerstein, the German translation of The Flintstones
 Nathan John Feuerstein (born 1991), American rapper better known as NF
 Reuven Feuerstein (born 1921), educator, psychologist, known for theory of Mediated Learning
 Sandra J. Feuerstein (1946–2021), American judge
 Steven Feuerstein (born 1958), author, educator, known for his work with the Oracle PL/SQL language
 Thomas Feuerstein (born 1968), Austrian artist and author
 Valentin Peter Feuerstein (1917–1999), also known as Peter Valentin Feuerstein, German painter and stained-glass artist

See also 
 Firestone

German-language surnames
Jewish surnames